Hurd State Park is a public recreation area lying adjacent to George Dudley Seymour State Park on the east bank of the Connecticut River in the town of East Hampton, Connecticut. In addition to offering hiking, picnicking, and mountain biking, it is one of four Connecticut state parks that offer primitive camping for boaters on the Connecticut River.

History
The park is named for the Hurd family, who came to the region from Massachusetts in 1710. The state purchased the park's first 150 acres in 1914. Shortly after its acquisition, the park became the focus of legal action to determine the ownership of mining privileges when Jesse S. Miller claimed rights to the feldspar on the property; the state ultimately prevailed in the Connecticut State Supreme Court in 1935.

References

External links
 Hurd State Park - Chatham Historical Society
 Hurd State Park Connecticut Department of Energy and Environmental Protection
Hurd State Park Map Connecticut Department of Energy and Environmental Protection

State parks of Connecticut
Parks in Middlesex County, Connecticut
East Hampton, Connecticut
Protected areas established in 1914
1914 establishments in Connecticut